Miežionys is a village in the Vilnius district municipality, Lithuania. According to the 2011 census, its population was 92.

From 1923 to 1939 the village was located in Wilno Voivodeship, in the north-eastern part of the Second Polish Republic. After the Nazi German and Soviet invasions of Poland in September 1939 the village was transferred to Lithuania according to the Soviet–Lithuanian Mutual Assistance Treaty.

During the Nazi occupation in World War II the village gave assistance to the Jews organised into food gathering groups sent from the Jewish ghetto in Radun, including those who escaped the German massacre of May 10, 1942. Among them was Leon Kahn, who appeared with his father in Mieżańce (Mizhantz) while wandering around the area. The villagers took them in and gave them food and help. Sarah Fishkin of Rubieżewicze left a diary attesting to repeated acts of kindness by villagers in that area.

Notes

References
  Filip Sulimierski, Bronisław Chlebowski, Władysław Walewski, Słownik geograficzny Królestwa Polskiego i innych krajów słowiańskich T. 6, Warszawa, pp. 363–364. Chapter:  Mieżańce
 Danuta Danowska,  Gminy z dorobkiem w tle Tygodnik Zwiazku Polakow na Litwie

Villages in Vilnius County
Vilnius District Municipality